The Volleyball at the 2019 Summer Universiade in Naples will be played between July 5 and July 13. 32 volleyball teams will participate in the tournament. The indoor volleyball competition will take place at PalaCoscioni in Nocera Inferiore, Palazzetto dello Sport in Ariano Irpino, PalaSele in Eboli and PalaTedeschi in Benevento.

Qualification
Following the FISU regulations, The maximum of 16 teams in volleyball events where the number of entries is larger than the authorised participation level will be selected by 
 The entry and the payment of guarantee.
 Those 8 teams finishing top rankings of the previous edition will be automatically qualified.
 Those 4 teams finishing bottom rankings of the previous edition will be replaced by new applying teams.
 The host is automatically qualified
 The remaining teams will be selected by wild card system according to geographical, continental representation, FISU ranking and FIVB ranking.

Qualified teams

Men's competition

Women's competition

Draw
The pool will be drawn in accordance with FISU regulations based on the following criteria:
 Previous Summer Universiade results
 Participation in previous Summer Universiades
 Continental representation
 FIVB rankings

Men's competition

Women's competition

Pools composition

Men's competition

Women's competition

Medal summary

Medal table

Medal events

References

External links
2019 Summer Universiade – Volleyball
Results book – Volleyball

 
2019
U
2019 Summer Universiade events
Universiade